is a railway station in the city of Kiyosu, Aichi Prefecture,  Japan, operated by Meitetsu. It is located to the Shinkawa Inspection Depot for the Nagoya Railway.

Lines
Sukaguchi Station is a junction station served by the Meitetsu Nagoya Main Line and the Meitetsu Tsushima Line.

Station layout
The station has two elevated island platforms connected by a footbridge. The station has automated ticket machines, Manaca automated turnstiles and is staffed.

Platforms

Adjacent stations

Station history
Sukaguchi Station was opened on January 23, 1914.  The tracks were elevated and station rebuilt in 1988.

Passenger statistics
In fiscal 2013, the station was used by an average of 7684 passengers daily.

Surrounding area
 Kiyosu City Hall

See also
 List of Railway Stations in Japan

References

External links

 Official web page 

Railway stations in Japan opened in 1914
Railway stations in Aichi Prefecture
Stations of Nagoya Railroad
Kiyosu, Aichi